The women's singles in table tennis at the 2019 European Games in Minsk is the second edition of the event in a European Games. It was held at the Tennis Olympic Centre from 22 to 26 June 2019.

Schedule
All times are FET (UTC+03:00)

Seeds
The seeding lists were announced on 9 June 2019.

Draw

Finals

Top half

Section 1

Section 2

Bottom half

Section 3

Section 4

References

External links
Results

Women's singles